This is a list of women artists who were born in Egypt or whose artworks are closely associated with that country.

A
Inji Aflatoun (1924–1989), painter, activist
Mariam A. Aleem (1930–2010), printed design artist 
Doa Aly (born 1976), contemporary artist
Ghada Amer (born 1963), contemporary artist, based in New York
Sawsan Amer (active since 1970s), artist, educator
Heba Amin (born 1980), artist, educator
Evelyn Ashamallah (born 1948), Coptic painter

B
Clea Badaro (1913–1968), painter
Lara Baladi (born 1969), Egyptian-Lebanese photographer, multimedia artist

D
 Dina Danish (born 1981), French-born Egyptian multimedia artist

G
 Sherin Guirguis (born 1974), contemporary artist

H
Tahia Halim (1919–2003), painter
Nermine Hammam (born 1967), filmmaker, graphic designer, painter, photographer
Amira Hanafi (born 1979), American/Egyptian poet and artist active in electronic literature
Susan Hefuna (born 1962), German-Egyptian visual artist
Helena of Egypt (4th century BC), painter

I 

 Iman Issa (born 1979), multi-disciplinary artist

K
Amal Kenawy (1974–2012), contemporary artist
Hend Kheera (born 1981), street artist

M 

 Maha Maamoun (born 1972), American-born Egyptian video artist and photographer, curator

N 
Effat Nagy (1905–1994), painter
Sabah Naim (born 1967), multimedia artist
Margaret Nakhla  (1908–1977), painter

R 

 Khadiga Riad (1914–1981), painter, surrealist

S
Gazbia Sirry (1925–2021), painter
Nadia Sirry (born 1958), painter

T
Aya Tarek (active since 2008), street artist

-
Egyptian women artists, List of
Artists
Artists